Terminal station is a station in Arifiye, Turkey. It is serviced by Adaray commuter trains operating between Arifiye and Adapazarı. Terminal station was opened on 28 May 2013 along with the opening of the Adaray line and is one four new stations built on the  railway to Adapazarı. The new Adapazarı Bus Terminal is located adjacent to the station.

Adaray service has been indefinitely suspended as of 12 December 2016.

References

External links
Sakarya Büyükşehir Belediyesi

2013 establishments in Turkey
Railway stations in Sakarya Province
Railway stations opened in 2013
Defunct railway stations in Turkey
Arifiye